James Joseph Hines (December 18, 1876 – March 26, 1957) was a Democratic Party politician and one of the most powerful leaders of Tammany Hall in New York City.

Biography
In his early years, Hines acted as a caretaker to residents in New York's Eleventh Assembly District.  This helped him win support and influence over the area's residents. In the 1920s and 1930s, Hines maintained "absolute power" over his district and was arguably the most powerful political boss in Tammany Hall.

Jimmy Walker's election as Mayor of New York City would also firmly establish Hines' influence over the local political scene  As boss of Tammany Hall's Eleventh Assembly District in uptown Manhattan, Hines had access to various sources of wealth and developed close ties with many mobsters such as Lucky Luciano, leader of the city's dominant Luciano crime family.

In 1932, New York Governor Franklin D. Roosevelt ran for President and wanted to weaken Tammany Hall.  Walker, who was tainted by allegations of corruption and was a threat to Roosevelt's campaign, into resigning. Seeing Tammany Hall as a political liability, Roosevelt decided to appoint a new mayor, a privilege the New York Governor had after any mayor of New York City resigned, and focused on backing a candidate who would destroy Tammany Hall's power for good.

Liberal Republican Fiorello LaGuardia, a former Representative and a fierce opponent of Tammany Hall whom Hines had successfully forced from power in the 1932 Congressional election, was elected mayor in 1933, and Tammany Hall's longtime influence over local politicians faded. Hines would not fall. After becoming President, Roosevelt appointed Hines to oversee the U.S. civil service's patronage system for employees in the Manhattan District. Hines' empire grew soon afterward.

In 1938, Hines was accused of being involved in the policy racket with Dutch Schultz (who was murdered in 1935) and Dixie Davis and of violating the "lottery laws".  Manhattan District Attorney Thomas E. Dewey would successfully get Hines convicted on 13 counts of racketeering. Hines provided protection for the policy racket in Harlem and other sections of New York. Hines was charged with influencing Magistrates Capshaw and Erwin to throw out policy cases in which the other conspirators had an interest and to influence former District Attorney William C. Dodge to 'go easy' on policy prosecutions. Hines was alleged to have received a cut in the proceeds of the policy racket.

After the first trial ended in a mistrial, he was charged again and Charles Cooper Nott, Jr. presided over the second trial.

He died on March 26, 1957 at the Long Beach Memorial Hospital.

Timeline
1876 Birth on December 18
1904 Married Geneva E. Cox, had three children
1912 Election for New York City Eleventh Assembly District
1913 Chief Clerk to the Board of Aldermen
1918 Lieutenant in the Motor Transport Corps during World War I
1920 Won primary in New York City Eleventh Assembly District
1921 Lost election to become Manhattan Borough President
1926 Jimmy Walker is elected mayor of New York and Hines establishes a foothold in Tammany Hall.
1932-Plays a major role in unseating popular anti-Tammany Hall Congressman Fiorello LaGuardia.  However, LaGuardia would be elected Mayor of New York City the following year and Tammany Hall would soon lose its longtime control over the city's political scene
1933 After endorsing Roosevelt for President, Roosevelt appoints him to oversee the US Civil Service's patronage system in the Manhattan District.  With this new post, his hold on power is able to withstand LaGuardia's popular purge of Tammany Hall
1938 Indicted for protection of the Dutch Schultz mob and for complicity in a lottery or numbers game in August
1938 Mistrial declared by New York General Sessions Court Justice Pecora on September 12
1939 Hines found guilty of all charges in a New York General Sessions Court retrial in February
1939 Sentenced to 4–8 years in prison on March 23
1944 Hines paroled on September 12
1957 Death on March 26

References

External links 
 

1876 births
1957 deaths
Leaders of Tammany Hall
Numbers game
New York (state) Democrats